Careliopsis styliformis is a species of sea snail, a marine gastropod mollusk in the family Pyramidellidae, the pyrams and their allies. The species is one of three species within the Careliopsis genus of gastropods, with the exception of the others being Careliopsis clathratula and Careliopsis modesta. The species is one of two species to maintain a binomial authority proposed by Mörch in 1875, the other proposal by Mörch is Careliopsis clathratula.

Distribution
This species occurs in the following locations:
 Caribbean Sea
 Gulf of Mexico
 Lesser Antilles
 Mexico

References

External links
 To Biodiversity Heritage Library (4 publications)
 To Encyclopedia of Life
 To ITIS
 To World Register of Marine Species

Pyramidellidae
Gastropods described in 1875